Izen is a surname. Notable people with the surname include: 

Marshall Izen, American entertainer
Michael Izen (born 1967), American bishop